The 2010–11 English football season was Wigan Athletic F.C.'s 33rd season in the Football League and their sixth consecutive season in the Premier League.

Season review

Pre-season
Following a mixed first season in charge of the club, manager Roberto Martínez decided to make several additions to the playing squad. Wigan's most expensive summer signing was Argentine striker Mauro Boselli, who signed for an undisclosed fee believed to be in the region of £6 million. Dutch defender Mario Melchiot and Austrian midfielder Paul Scharner both left the club after their contracts expired. Gary Caldwell was named as the new club captain.

There were also changes behind the scenes, with general manager John Benson leaving the club to join Sunderland, re-uniting with former Wigan manager Steve Bruce. Director Maurice Lindsay also stepped down to take up the position of chairman at Preston North End.

Wigan's first pre-season friendly was a 3–2 win against Östersunds FK, with new signing Boselli scoring twice. Their next friendly was a 1–1 draw against Oldham Athletic, featuring trialists Laurent Merlin and Sekou Baradji. Baradji also joined the squad at their pre-season training camp in Austria, but would ultimately not be offered a contract.

August
The season started badly for Wigan with two heavy defeats at home – a 4–0 loss against newly promoted Blackpool and a 6–0 defeat to reigning Premier League champions Chelsea. Things improved with a 3–0 win in the League Cup against Hartlepool United, followed by a shock 1–0 away win against Tottenham Hotspur – the same fixture in which they suffered a club record 9–1 defeat less than twelve months earlier. The club was active on transfer deadline day, completing the signings of Tom Cleverley on loan from Manchester United and Franco Di Santo on a three-year deal from Chelsea. Charles N'Zogbia also remained at Wigan after having a bid accepted for him from Birmingham City, but failing to agree personal terms.

September
After an international break, Wigan's first game of the month was against Sunderland, which saw Lee Cattermole and Titus Bramble appear at the DW Stadium for the first time since leaving Wigan. Despite Cattermole being sent off in the first half, Wigan failed to capitalise on their man advantage and drew the match 1–1. The Latics then slipped into the bottom three after a 2–0 home defeat to Manchester City in the following game. The club progressed once again in the League Cup, winning the match 2–1 after a late comeback against Preston North End. The club finished the month with a goalless draw at Birmingham City.

October
On 2 October, Wigan Athletic picked up their first Premier League home win of the season after defeating Wolverhampton Wanderers 2–0. Two weeks later, the club drew 2–2 away against Newcastle United, with Charles N'Zogbia scoring both goals for Wigan against his former club. Wigan extended their unbeaten run with a 1–1 draw at home against Bolton Wanderers, but midfielder James McCarthy suffered an ankle injury which kept him out of action until the end of January. In the following game however, Gary Caldwell returned to the line-up for the first time since his hip operation during the summer as the team reached the quarter-finals of the League Cup following a 2–0 victory against Swansea City. On 30 October, Wigan were beaten 2–0 by Fulham.

November
Wigan started the month with a second away defeat in a row, losing 2–1 to Blackburn Rovers. Results then improved in their following two home games with a 1–1 draw against Liverpool and a 1–0 win against West Bromwich Albion. The club lost 2–0 in its next match against Manchester United, finishing the match with nine men after Antolín Alcaraz and Hugo Rodallega were sent off. Two more away defeats followed, against West Ham United and Arsenal in the quarter-final of the League Cup, during which Victor Moses dislocated his shoulder, meaning he would be out of action for three months.

December
Wigan came from behind twice to draw 2–2 with Stoke City in their first game of the month. The team then extended their unbeaten run with a draw against Everton, a win against Wolverhampton Wanderers and another draw with Arsenal. On 31 December, the club completed the signing of Adrián López on a free transfer.

January
Wigan lost their first game of the month against Newcastle United, the club's first defeat at home since September. This was followed by an away draw against Bolton Wanderers.

Transfers

In

Out

Released

Loans in

Loans out

Player statistics
As of 24 April 2011

Starting 11
Considering starts in all competitions

Match results

Legend

Pre-season

Premier League

Results per matchday

League Cup

FA Cup

References

External links
Official website

Wigan Athletic F.C. seasons
Wigan Athletic